Don Sasa (born September 16, 1972) is a former American football defensive tackle in the National Football League for the San Diego Chargers, Washington Redskins, Carolina Panthers, and the Detroit Lions.  He played college football at Washington State University and was drafted in the third round of the 1995 NFL Draft.

Sasa is currently living in North Carolina with his two sons and wife.

External links
Just Sports Stats

1972 births
Living people
American football defensive tackles
American sportspeople of Samoan descent
Washington State Cougars football players
San Diego Chargers players
Washington Redskins players
Carolina Panthers players
Detroit Lions players
Chicago Enforcers players
Players of American football from American Samoa